Mimi Spencer is a journalist and author. A feature-writer and columnist for such titles as the Daily Mail, the Evening Standard, the Guardian, The Spectator, Marie Claire, Harper's Bazaar, and Observer Food Monthly.

Spencer is the author of 101 Things To Do Before You Diet and The Fast Diet with Michael Mosley.

Career

Spencer began her career with Vogue magazine followed by two years editing ES Magazine and won Fashion Journalist of the year whilst working as Fashion Editor at the Evening Standard in 2000. She writes a weekly column for The Mail on Sunday'''s You Magazine.

She also runs a Q&A Network, Wonderstuff, which she set up in 2007.

Personal life

Spencer lives in Brighton with her husband, Paul Bowen, a human rights barrister, and has two children.

Published works101 Things to do Before You Diet'' (Transworld, 2009)

References

External links
 Official website
 

Living people
English journalists
1967 births
People from Brighton